In mathematics, a skew gradient of a harmonic function over a simply connected domain with two real dimensions is a vector field that is everywhere orthogonal to the gradient of the function and that has the same magnitude as the gradient.

Definition
The skew gradient can be defined using complex analysis and the Cauchy–Riemann equations.

Let  be a complex-valued analytic function, where u,v are real-valued scalar functions of the real variables x, y.

A skew gradient is defined as:

 

and from the Cauchy–Riemann equations, it is derived that

Properties
The skew gradient has two interesting properties. It is everywhere orthogonal to the gradient of u, and of the same length:

References

 Peter Olver, Introduction to Partial Differential Equations, ch. 7, p. 232 

Differential calculus
Generalizations of the derivative
Linear operators in calculus
Vector calculus